María Elena Álvarez-Buylla Roces (born July 11, 1959) is a Mexican professor of molecular genetics at National Autonomous University of Mexico and the director of the Consejo Nacional de Ciencia y Tecnología appointed by Andrés Manuel López Obrador in 2018.

Early life and education 
Álvarez-Buylla was born into an elite and privileged family of scientists in Mexico City in 1959. Her father Ramón Álvarez-Buylla was a neurophysiologist and founder of the Department of Physiology at CINVESTAV. Her mother, Elena Roces Dorronsoro, is a biologist and researcher at the University of Colima. Her grandparents worked in aviation and her uncle is the economist José Carlos Roces Dorronsoro. Her brother, Arturo Álvarez-Buylla, is a neurobiologist. She attended the National Autonomous University of Mexico, where she studied biology and graduated in 1983. Her undergraduate dissertation involved ethnobotany, and was acknowledged by the Botanical Society of Mexico. She was awarded the Gabino Barreda medal for her educational performance. She remained at the National Autonomous University of Mexico for her master's degree, where she investigated Cecropia from Los Tuxtlas. In 1986 Álvarez-Buylla moved to the University of California, Berkeley for her doctoral studies, where she worked with Montgomery Slatkin on rainforests. After earning her PhD Álvarez-Buylla was appointed a postdoctoral researcher at the University of California, San Diego, where she worked in La Jolla on molecular genetics.

Research and career 
She has investigated how genetic information is mapped onto a phenotype. She joined the Institute of Ecology at the National Autonomous University of Mexico in 1992. Here she leads the Laboratory of Genetics, Epigenetics, Development and Evolution of Plants. Her work is centred in developmental ecology, and she has looked to understand the mechanisms of cell differentiation and morphogenesis. She has focussed on the balance between proliferation and cell differentiation in the Arabidopsis thaliana. She has investigated the hormonal pathways in plants, as well as studying how they respond to different environments. Álvarez-Buylla has worked in both experimental and theoretical science, developing models that can predict phenotypic patterns, and monitor the role of the environment in complex feedback networks. She provided the framework for understanding of MADS-box genes, which act as regulators of plant and animal development. 

Following on from her early career studying rainforests, Álvarez-Buylla has continued to research biodiversity in Mexico. She has created demographic-genetic mathematical models to help with forest regeneration and predict the effects of harvest and species extinction. The models developed by Álvarez-Buylla are used in conservation and forest management worldwide. Her research has identified over 20 new scientific species. She has monitored the biosecurity of Lacandonia schismatica, a crop of immense importance to Mexican communities, as well as various pine populations.

Advocacy and academic service 
Álvarez-Buylla was a member of the Mexican delegation for the Pugwash Conferences on Science and World Affairs. She co-founded, with numerous other scientists, the Mexico Union of Scientists Committed to Society, and has called for more research to be done into the impact of genetically modified crops while using her position as head of Mexico’s ministry of science and technology to thwart research in biotechnology   In 2018 Álvarez-Buylla became the first woman to be appointed the Director of the Consejo Nacional de Ciencia y Tecnología (CONACYT). In this capacity, she is the primary scientific advisor to Andrés Manuel López Obrador, the President of Mexico, and in charge of the $1.5 billion budget. In 2019 she announced that the humanities were to become included into the council, and it would be renamed CONAHCYT. As head of CONACYT, Álvarez-Buylla has been instrumental in contributing to the centralization of science and technology governance in Mexico by reducing the role of civil society organizations in the sector and actively shaping the administration of higher education institutions against the will of their researchers, students, and workers. Various international organizations questioned the interference of CONACYT and Álvarez-Buylla without apparent responses from either the ministry or its director.

Awards and honours 
Her awards and honours include;

 1994 American Society of Naturalists Jasper Loftus-Hills Young Investigators Award 
 1999 Mexican Academy of Sciences National Research Award
 2008 Mexico City Heberto Castillo Prize
 2010 National Autonomous University of Mexico National University Award 
 2011 National Autonomous University of Mexico Faustino Miranda Medal
 2016 Elected to the Board of Directors of National Autonomous University of Mexico
 2016 Universidad Autónoma de San Luis Potosí National Prize for Scientific-Technological Research
 2017 National Prize of Sciences and Arts

Selected publications 
Her publications include;

Scandals 
Since taking up her current post as director of the Consejo Nacional de Ciencia y Tecnología, María Elena Álvarez-Buylla Roces has undertaken actions against the community that she represents. The most recent is a plot for criminalizing 31 scientists and academicians of the same council that she leads, CONACYT. Those 31 scientists and academicians have publicly and openly expressed their differences with the current policies of the CONACYT, and have outcried the persecution of those who exercised their functions based on the regulations then in force, which were guided by a different conception of the country's scientific and technological development.

The context of the plot :
 Alejandro Gertz Manero the current Attorney General of Mexico under the government of Andrés Manuel López Obrador has been trying for 11 years to be a member of the National System of Researchers (Sistema Nacional de Investigadores or SNI), however, the SNI concluded that he has no merits for being a member.
 Gertz Manero rejects the conclusions from the SNI and files a discrimination complaint before the National Council to Prevent Discrimination (Spanish: Consejo Nacional para Prevenir La Discriminación; CONAPRED).
 María Elena Álvarez-Buylla states that the petitioner was right in alleging that the results of the SNI Evaluation Commissions are "arbitrary". Álvarez-Buylla exercises her own non-arbitrary judgment and rules that "irregularities and human rights violations were committed", since "an arbitrary exercise of the evaluation functions has been detected, as well as partiality and lack of objectivity" leading to "discriminatory practices".
 María Elena Álvarez-Buylla grants Alejandro Gertz Manero the highest level as a member of the SNI, level III, even when Gertz Manero has been accused of plagiarism of the book Guillermo Prieto (Biography), published by the Secretaría de Educación Pública in 1967.
 Alejandro Gertz Manero as Attorney General of Mexico presents criminal charges against members of the SNI who rejected his entry to the SNI, and states that those academics “used federal funds meant for scientific research on a private organization, buying furniture, vehicles, properties, and paying salaries and other services”. However, no wrongdoing can be claimed since those academicians proceeded according to a law of 2019, which was in force when they used those funds.

References 

1959 births
Living people
Academic staff of the National Autonomous University of Mexico